Deshabandu James Edward Herath Herald known as Harold Herath (10 March 1930 – 31 August 2007)  was a senior Sri Lankan politician and Cabinet Minister. Herath was most notably Minister of Foreign Affairs under President Ranasinghe Premadasa from 1991 to 1993. He entered Parliament winning the Nattandiya electorate in the Puttalam Electoral District 1977, and held his seat until 2000 retiring not contesting the 2001 parliamentary election. He has also held the portfolios of Minister of Justice and Minister of Coconut Development.

In 2005 Harold Herath was conferred the national honour and title Deshabandu by President Chandrika Kumaratunga. Harold Herath died on 31 August 2007 after a brief illness, he was 77. He was married to Gwen Herath, a former Provincial Council member and President of the Women's Cricket Association of Sri Lanka (WCASL), and was father to three children.

See also
 Minister of Foreign Affairs (Sri Lanka)

References

Foreign ministers of Sri Lanka
United National Party politicians
Justice ministers of Sri Lanka
Members of the 9th Parliament of Sri Lanka
Members of the 10th Parliament of Sri Lanka
1930 births
2007 deaths
Ministers of state of Sri Lanka
Deputy ministers of Sri Lanka
Non-cabinet ministers of Sri Lanka
Deshabandu
Sinhalese politicians